The Southern Rocade is a planned bypass arterial road in Moscow which is a part of Moscow Chord Ring. Its completion is scheduled for 2023.

Gallery

References 

Roads in Moscow